Aleksei Kulashko (born 3 July 1972) is a New Zealand chess player holding the title of FIDE Master (FM).

Born in Leningrad, he moved to New Zealand after graduating from university.

Kulashko has represented New Zealand in four Chess Olympiads: in Elista 1998, Bled 2002, Baku 2016 and Batumi 2018 playing board 1 in 1998, 2002 and 2016. His best result was in 1998 when he scored 7.5/11, and finished in 9th place.

Kulashko won the New Zealand Chess Championship in 1996/97, 1997/98, 1999/2000 and in 2015/16 (jointly with Michael V. R. Steadman). In 2016 he also became Oceania champion. He also won the New Zealand Rapid Chess Championship in 1997/1998.

He competed in the Oceania Zonal Chess Championship in 1999, 2000, and 2005.

References

External links 

Aleksei Kulashko chess games at 365Chess.com

1972 births
Living people
New Zealand chess players
Russian chess players
Chess Olympiad competitors
Chess FIDE Masters
Russian emigrants to New Zealand
Sportspeople from Saint Petersburg